In mathematics, a Hopfian group is a group G for which every epimorphism

G → G

is an isomorphism. Equivalently, a group is Hopfian if and only if it is not isomorphic to any of its proper quotients.  A group G is co-Hopfian if every monomorphism

G → G

is an isomorphism.  Equivalently, G is not isomorphic to any of its proper subgroups.

Examples of Hopfian groups
 Every finite group, by an elementary counting argument. 
 More generally, every polycyclic-by-finite group.
 Any finitely generated free group.
 The group Q of rationals.
 Any finitely generated residually finite group.
 Any word-hyperbolic group.

Examples of non-Hopfian groups
 Quasicyclic groups.
 The group R of real numbers. 
 The Baumslag–Solitar group B(2,3).

Properties

It was shown by  that it is an undecidable problem to determine, given a finite presentation of a group, whether the group is Hopfian.

References

External links

Non-Hopf group in the Encyclopedia of Mathematics

Infinite group theory
Properties of groups